Carex meyeriana is a species of sedge native across Siberia to north and central Japan.

Description
Carex meyeriana grows 50 cm tall.

Distribution
Carex meyeriana is native to Siberia and Japan.

References

meyeriana
Flora of Japan
Flora of Siberia